Joan-Lluís Lluís (Perpignan, 1963) is a Catalan writer. His works include five novels and a collection of essays entitled Conversa amb el meu gos sobre França i els francesos (Conversation with my Dog about France and the French, 2002). This last work, which Lluís himself describes as a pamphlet, focuses on the precarious linguistic situation of the Catalans under French administration.

He is co-author, with musician Pascal Comelade, of a manifesto published in 1998 by linguistic and cultural activists from Northern Catalonia. His 2004 novel El dia de l'ós (The Day of the Bear) won the prestigious Joan Creixells Prize, and his novel Jo soc aquell que va matar Franco (I'm the one who killed Franco) received the Sant Jordi Award and the Maria Àngels Anglada Prize.

Works
Els ulls de sorra (Eyes of Sand) (La Magrana, Barcelona, 1993)
Vagons robats (Stolen Carriages) (La Magrana, Barcelona, 1995)
Cirera (Cherry) (La Magrana, Barcelona, 1996)
El crim de l'escriptor cansat (The Crime of the Weary Writer) (La Magrana, Barcelona, 1999)
Conversa amb el meu gos sobre França i els francesos (Conversation with my Dog about France and the French) (La Magrana, Barcelona, 2002). Premi Joan Coromines de la CAL. A collection of essays.
El dia de l'ós (The Day of the Bear) (ed. de la Magrana, Barcelona, 2004). Joan Crexells Prize.
Pascal Comelade i Arsène Lupin, les proves irrefutables d'una enginyosa mistificació (Mare Nostrum, Perpignan, 2005).
Diccionari dels llocs imaginaris dels Països Catalans (Dictionary of Imaginary Places in the Catalan Countries) (RBA, 2006)
Aiguafang (ed. de la Magrana, Barcelona, 2008). Serra d'Or Prize.
Xocolata desfeta, exercicis d'espill (ed. de la Magrana, Barcelona, 2010)A cremallengua, elogi de la diversitat lingüística (ed. Viena, Barcelona, 2011). Les cròniques del déu coix (The Lame God's Chronicles) (ed. Proa, Barcelona, 2013). Lletra d'Or Prize.El navegant (ed. Proa, Barcelona, 2016). Serra d'Or Prize.Jo soc aquell que va matar Franco'' (ed. Proa, Barcelona, 2018). Sant Jordi Prize.

External links

References

Living people
1963 births
Catalan-language writers